Arnaud-Sylvain-André Merklé (born 25 April 2000) is a French badminton player from Staffelfelden. He was the boys singles European Junior Champion in 2018, and also part of the national junior team that clinched the mixed team title in 2017 and 2018. He participated at the 2018 Summer Youth Olympics in Buenos Aires, Argentina, and reached the boys' singles bronze medal match losing to Kodai Naraoka of Japan in the rubber game.

Career 
In 2022, Merklé reached his first BWF World Tour final at the Syed Modi International. The final match between Merklé and his compatriot Lucas Claerbout was called off after Merklé tested positive for COVID-19. Both players were later awarded as runner-up with 5.950 ranking point.

Achievements

European Junior Championships 
Boys' singles

BWF World Tour 
The BWF World Tour, which was announced on 19 March 2017 and implemented in 2018, is a series of elite badminton tournaments sanctioned by the Badminton World Federation (BWF). The BWF World Tour is divided into levels of World Tour Finals, Super 1000, Super 750, Super 500, Super 300, and the BWF Tour Super 100.

Men's singles

BWF International Challenge/Series (5 titles, 2 runners-up) 
Men's singles

  BWF International Challenge tournament
  BWF International Series tournament
  BWF Future Series tournament

References

External links 
 

2000 births
Living people
Sportspeople from Mulhouse
French male badminton players
Badminton players at the 2018 Summer Youth Olympics